The 1995 Marlboro 500 was the thirteenth round of the 1995 PPG Indy Car World Series season. The race was held on July 30, 1995, at the 2.00 mi Michigan International Speedway in Brooklyn, Michigan. The race is historically significant for Firestone's first IndyCar win since 1974. Patrick Racing driver Scott Pruett took his first win in American open-wheel competition after a late-race battle with defending series champion Al Unser Jr., winning by just over half a second. Adrian Fernández came in third place, one lap behind Pruett and Unser. Parker Johnstone earned his first pole position and fastest lap in the series but suffered brake problems that forced him to retire; rookie André Ribeiro led the first ever laps of his career, ultimately earning a point for leading the most laps during the race. Danny Sullivan's IndyCar career would come to an end at leader's lap 194 as he would be involved in a crash where he would suffer a broken pelvis and other injuries.

This was the first time the series competed on the newly resurfaced circuit, which made the track smoother and easier to drive on. Nevertheless, the race still saw massive attrition knock out many of the front-runners over the grueling 500-mile distance. Many cars suffered problems with failing wheel bearings and blistering tires. By the halfway point in the race, it was essentially a two-horse race between Pruett and Unser while the rest of the field simply struggled to make it to the end. Points leader Jacques Villeneuve, despite spending extensive time on pit lane trying to diagnose an engine problem, managed to finish tenth and keep his substantial lead in the points standings.

Qualifying

Robby Gordon crashed during practice and was not cleared to participate in the rest of the weekend.

Race

Notes
– Includes one bonus point for leading the most laps.
– Includes one bonus point for being the fastest qualifier.

 = Series rookie = Former Marlboro 500 winner

Race Statistics
Lead changes: 18 among 8 drivers
Average Speed: 159.676 mph

Standings after the race
Drivers' Championship standings

 Note: Only the top five positions are included for the standings.

References

Marlboro 500, 1995
Michigan Indy 400